The year 653 BC was a year of the pre-Julian Roman calendar. In the Roman Empire, it was known as year 101 Ab urbe condita . The denomination 653 BC for this year has been used since the early medieval period, when the Anno Domini calendar era became the prevalent method in Europe for naming years.

Events

By place

Middle East 
 Elamite forces attack southern Babylon. A large Assyrian army sent by king Ashurbanipal defeat the Elamites and kill their king, Temti-Humban-Inshushinak I. He is succeeded by his nephew Humban-Nikash II.

Births

Deaths
 Tantamani, king (pharaoh) of Egypt
 Temti-Humban-Inshushinak I, king of Elam

References